Gideon Acheampong Boateng (born 26 August 1991 in Accra) is a Ghanaian professional footballer, who plays in Belgium for CS Visé as a striker. He holds both a Ghanaian passport and a Belgian passport.

Career
Boateng began his career 2004 by Royal Antwerp, he joined later to Lierse in 2005. He played with Lierse one year before scouted in 2006 from Anderlecht. Boateng played in Brussels 3 years before he transferred to MVV Maastricht on 15 December 2008. He signed a three and half year contract. In January 2012, Boateng transferred from Dutch club MVV Maastricht to Belgian club CS Visé in order to help the Belgian club gain promotion from the 2011–12 Belgian Second Division to the 2012–2013 Belgian Pro League.

References

Gideon wasn't a professional footballer

External links
Gideon Boateng - CS Visé Profile 
Gideon Boateng - MVV Profile 

1991 births
Ghanaian footballers
R.S.C. Anderlecht players
Living people
Footballers from Accra
Expatriate footballers in Belgium
Lierse S.K. players
Association football forwards
Royal Antwerp F.C. players
MVV Maastricht players
C.S. Visé players
Eerste Divisie players
Challenger Pro League players
Ghanaian emigrants to Belgium
Belgian expatriate footballers
Belgian footballers
Expatriate footballers in the Netherlands
Belgian expatriate sportspeople in the Netherlands